Edoardo Scanagatta (born 6 April 2002) is an Italian professional footballer who plays as a defender for Mestre.

Club career
On 16 July 2022, Scanagatta signed a two-year contract with Giugliano. On 30 January 2023, his contract with Giugliano was terminated by mutual consent. Two days later, Scanagatta joined Serie D club Mestre.

References

External links

2002 births
Living people
Italian footballers
Italy youth international footballers
Association football defenders
Atalanta B.C. players
Paganese Calcio 1926 players
S.S.C. Giugliano players
A.C. Mestre players
Serie C players